The 2015 Savannah Steam season was the first season for the professional indoor football franchise, and first in X-League Indoor Football (X-League).

On October 15, 2013, the X-League announced the league would be expanding in to Reading, Pennsylvania with the Pennsylvania Steam. That same day, the team announced Shane Houser would be the team's first ever head coach.

After playing one road game as the Pennsylvania Steam, the franchise was sold by Missouri Sports Holdings to an ownership group led by Bobby Dammarell in Savannah, Georgia. The team played their remaining three road games as the Savannah Steam, while the four home games that were scheduled to take place in Reading, Pennsylvania were cancelled and counted as wins for the opposing teams.

Schedule

Regular season
All start times are local to home team

Standings

 z-Indicates best regular season record
 x-Indicates clinched playoff berth

Roster

References

Savannah Steam
Pennsylvania Steam
Savannah Steam